Chailicyon is an extinct genus in the basal Carnivoramorph family Miacidae that lived in Asia during the Middle to Late Eocene.

Taxonomy
Chailicyon was named by Chow (1975). It was assigned to Miacidae by Carroll (1988).

Sources

museum03.museumwww.naturekundmuseum-berlin.de
The Terrestrial Eocene-Oligocene Transition in North America by Donald R. Prothero and Robert J. Emry  

Miacids
Eocene carnivorans
Eocene mammals of Asia
Prehistoric placental genera